The Dutch Open  is amongst the longest running darts tournaments having started back in 1973. The popularity of darts in the Netherlands since Raymond van Barneveld began amassing world titles has seen the number of entries for the tournament rise dramatically. The 2007 event had 2867 entries in the Men's Singles, 1179 in the Men's Pairs, 418 in the Women's Singles and 176 in the Women's Pairs. Although the tournament is classed an "Open" event, only players eligible to for the Winmau World Masters and BDO World Championship are now allowed to enter. This had ruled out PDC players from competing since 2006. Richard Kirby Hit a 9 dart finish in 1990 against Roland Scholten but was not televised.

The 2002 version of the tournament saw the first live nine dart finish during the final between Shaun Greatbatch and Steve Coote. Greatbatch checked out using T20, T15, D18 during the third leg of the second set, The tournament has been covered by Dutch SBS6 television in recent years, and also by Eurosport across Europe.

From 2002 to 2013 the tournament was held at NH Conference Centre Koningshof, Veldhoven but from 2014 the tournament will be held at De Bonte Wever, Assen.

2023 event was streamed live on the final day by RTL 7 in the Netherlands.

Dutch Open finals

Men's

Women's

Boys (U18)

Girls

Records and statistics

Tournament records
 Most wins 4:  Martin Adams.
 Most Finals 4:  Scott Waites,  Martin Adams. 
 Most Semi Finals 8:  Raymond van Barneveld.
 Most Quarter Finals 10:  Raymond van Barneveld.
 Most Appearances 12:  Raymond van Barneveld.
 Most Prize Money won  €15,620:  Martin Adams.
 Best winning average (106.35) :  Ted Hankey vs.  Raymond van Barneveld, 2003 Semi-Final.
 Youngest Winner age 25:   Steve Brown. 
 Oldest Winner age 58:  Martin Adams.

Nine-dart finishes

References

Darts tournaments
1973 establishments in the Netherlands
Darts in the Netherlands
Recurring sporting events established in 1973